During the 2001–02 English football season, Gillingham competed in the Football League First Division.

Season summary
Another satisfying season under player-manager Andy Hessenthaler saw Gillingham finish comfortably in 12th place despite many club rivals having better financial budgets to sign and pay players.

Final league table

 Pld = Matches ; W = Matches won; D = Matches drawn; L = Matches lost; F = Goals for; A = Goals against; GD = Goal difference; Pts = Points
 NB: In the Football League goals scored (F) takes precedence over goal difference (GD).

Results
Gillingham's score comes first

Legend

Football League First Division

FA Cup

League Cup

Squad

Reserve squad

References

Gillingham
Gillingham F.C. seasons